Ilija Đuričić (Ripanj, 18 July 1898 - Belgrade, 2 April 1965) was a Serbian veterinary physician, professor, rector of the University of Belgrade and president of Serbian Academy of Sciences and Arts.

Đuričić was elected member of SANU in 1950 and went on to serve as head of the academy in 1960-1965. He authored a number of books and was a full professor at the University of Belgrade and served as the rector on three separate terms. Ilija Đuričić was awarded the 7 July prize, Order of labour and elected corresponding member of Slovenian Academy of Sciences and Arts.

References

1898 births
1965 deaths
Members of the Serbian Academy of Sciences and Arts